Grefrath is a district of Neuss, North Rhine-Westphalia, Germany.

Population

Notable people
 Mathias Weber (1778-1803), robber

Neuss
North Rhine-Westphalia